British NVC community OV26 (Epilobium hirsutum community) is one of the open habitat communities in the British National Vegetation Classification system. It is one of four tall-herb weed communities.

This community is found throughout lowland Britain.

There are five subcommunities.

Community composition

The following constant species are found in this community:
 Great willowherb (Epilobium hirsutum)
 Common nettle (Urtica dioica)

There are no rare species associated with the community.

Distribution

This community is found throughout lowland Britain. It occurs on moist, but not waterlogged soils, and is one of the transitional vegetation types around open water and alongside lowland streams; it is often found on damp verges and in ditches alongside roads and tracks.

Subcommunities

There are five subcommunities:
 the Juncus effusus - Ranunculus repens subcommunity
 the ''Phragmites australis - Iris pseudacorus subcommunity the Filipendula ulmaria - Angelica sylvestris subcommunity the Arrhenatherum elatius - Heracleum sphondylium subcommunity the Urtica dioica - Cirsium arvense '' subcommunity

References

OV26